Tai'an is a railway station on the Taiwan Railways Administration Taichung line located in Houli District, Taichung, Taiwan. The current elevated station is not the first Tai'an Station nor is located at its original site. Due to the re-routing of the West Coast line, the TRA closed the Tai'an Old Station on the Former Mountain line and keeps it as a tourist and historical facility while transferring the actual transportation service to the new station.

Structure
Tai'an Station is an elevated train station, and the ticket vending machine is placed on the ground floor, and passengers go upstairs to the fifth floor to take the train.  There is an elevator for use by those who are physically disabled.  An island platform is located between the tracks at the station.

Platform layout

Service
As a minor station, Tai'an Station is primarily serviced by Local Trains (區間車). A few times per day a Chu-Kuang Express (莒光號) or a Tzu-Chiang Limited Express (自強號) stops at the station.

Around the station
 Liyutan Dam

See also
 List of railway stations in Taiwan

References

1998 establishments in Taiwan
Railway stations in Taichung
Railway stations opened in 1998
Railway stations served by Taiwan Railways Administration